Glycophorin-E is a protein that in humans is encoded by the GYPE gene.

The protein encoded by this gene is a sialoglycoprotein and a type I membrane protein. It is a member of a gene family with GPA and GPB genes. This encoded protein might carry the M blood group antigen. GYPA, GYPB, and GYPE are organized in tandem on chromosome 4. This gene might have derived from an ancestral gene common to the GPB gene by gene duplication. Two alternatively spliced transcript variants encoding the same protein have been described for this gene.

References

Further reading